The Girl with the Whip (German: Das Mädel mit der Peitsche) is a 1929 German silent comedy film directed by Carl Lamac and starring Anny Ondra, Werner Fuetterer and Sig Arno. It was shot at the Johannisthal Studios in Berlin. The film's art direction was by Heinrich Richter. It was based on a play by Hans H. Zerlett.

Cast
 Anny Ondra as Anny Nebenkrug 
 Werner Fuetterer as Edgar Krell 
 Sig Arno as Onkel Axmann 
 Gaston Jacquet as Professor Nebenkrug 
 Olga Limburg as Frau Professor Nebenkrug 
 Mimo von Delly as Mimi Gwenda, Tänzerin 
 Julius E. Herrmann   
 Karl Harbacher   
 Gerhard Ritterband   
 Josef Rovenský   
 Oreste Bilancia   
 Paul Goergens

References

Bibliography
Prawer, S.S. Between Two Worlds: The Jewish Presence in German and Austrian Film, 1910–1933. Berghahn Books, 2005.

External links

1929 films
Films of the Weimar Republic
1929 comedy films
German silent feature films
German comedy films
Films directed by Karel Lamač
German films based on plays
German black-and-white films
Silent comedy films
1920s German films
Films shot at Johannisthal Studios
1920s German-language films